Apgujeong Midnight Sun is a 2014 South Korean television series starring Park Ha-na, Kang Eun-tak, Baek Ok-dam and Song Won-geun. The daily drama aired on MBC from October 6, 2014 to May 15, 2015 on Mondays to Fridays at 20:55 for 149 episodes.

Plot
The lives of four people (and their families) intersect as they work at a cable TV station, where they learn that a fateful encounter can determine whether a man and a woman will become lovers or enemies.

Cast
 Park Ha-na as Baek Ya / Baek Seon-dong - The female lead, initially she is cruel and jealous to her sister in law but after her brother got into an accident, she learns to love her sister in law and get revenge to her mother, Seo Eun-ha.
 Kang Eun-tak as Jang Hwa-eom
 Baek Ok-dam as Yook Seon-ji - Baek Ya’s bestfriend.
 Kim Min-soo as Jo Na-dan (Jonathan) - Seo Eun-ha’s stepson, he loves Baek Ya so much.
 Lee Hyo-young as Jung Sam-hee - Hwa-eom's friend and writer
 Song Won-geun as Jang Moo-eom
 Hwang Jung-seo as Jo Ji-ah (Georgia) - Seo Eun-ha’s stepdaughter, a typical spoiled brat and arrogant heiress.
 Lee Bo-hee as Seo Eun-ha - Baek Ya’s greedy and evil birth mother, money matters to her more than her real children.
 Shim Hyung-tak as Baek Young-joon
 Im Chae-moo as Jang Choo-jang
 Park Hye-sook as Moon Jung-ae
 Jung Hye-sun as Ok Dan-shil
 Kim Ji-eun as Noh Ma-joo
 Han Ki-woong as Kang-ho
 Keum Dan-bi as Kim Hyo-kyung
 Lee Joo-hyun as Yook Seon-joong
 Kim Young-ran as Oh Dal-ran
 Han Jin-hee as Jo Jang-hoon
 Choi Su-rin as Mo-narija	
 Oh Ki-chan as Lee Ban-seok
 Kim Eun-jung as Ga-young
 Lee Ga-ryeong as Susanna Ahn

Controversy
In April 2015, the series received scrutiny from the Korea Communications Standards Commission for a revenge storyline that the review board deemed had too many "violent" and "unethical" scenes. Soon after, MBC released a statement that the network would no longer work with screenwriter Im Sung-han in future projects; Im responded by announcing her retirement.

International broadcast

References

External links
  
 Apgujeong Midnight Sun at MBC Global Media
 

MBC TV television dramas
2014 South Korean television series debuts
Korean-language television shows
South Korean melodrama television series